Franklin D. Roosevelt is a station on Line 1 and Line 9 of the Paris Métro. With more than nine million passengers annually (2019), it is the nineteenth busiest station in the Paris Métro system.

History
Originally, the stations on the two lines were separate. The Line 1 station opened as part of the first stage of the line between Porte de Vincennes and Porte Maillot on 19 July 1900 and was called Marbeuf. It was named after the Rue Marbeuf, which in turn was named after the Marquise de Marbeuf, who had developed the area in the 1770s and was guillotined during the Reign of Terror.

The Line 9 station opened when the line was extended from Trocadéro to Saint-Augustin on 27 May 1923 and was called Rond-Point des Champs-Élysées or just Rond-Point.  On 6 October 1942 a connection between the two stations was opened and the new station was renamed Marbeuf–Rond-Point des Champs-Élysées (or more often Champs-Élysées–Marbeuf). This new station became Franklin D. Roosevelt station in 1946 when the nearby Avenue Victor-Emmanuel III was renamed Franklin D. Roosevelt Avenue, in honour of US President Franklin D. Roosevelt who had been an ally of France during World War II, as opposed to Victor Emmanuel III, the king of Italy who, although allied with France during the First World War, had fought against France as king of Fascist Italy during the Second World War.

The station was renovated after the Second World War and the work introduced a new artistic technique known as "gemmail", which is often called "block glass" or "glass brick" in English. Sometimes it is also called a "station musée" (station-museum). While one can find some of the glass brick along the platform for Line 9, more of it can be found in along the platform serving Line 1. The inauguration of the finished station involved a large ceremony on the night of 1 March 1957, with two ramps equipped with tables of food for the invited guests.

As part of the automation project on Line 1, its platforms were completely renovated in 2008.

Attractions
 Access to the Petit and Grand Palais
 Beginning of the large amount of department stores on the Champs-Élysées (Virgin, Cartes IGN, etc.)
 Access to the tree-lined part of the Champs-Élysées

Station layout

Gallery

References

 Roland Pozzo di Borgo, Les Champs-Élysées: trois siècles d'histoire, 1997
 Gérard Roland, Stations de Métro. Paris: Bonneton éditeur, 2003. 231 pp. Revised and expanded edition, .

External links
 

Paris Métro stations in the 8th arrondissement of Paris
Railway stations in France opened in 1900